An asylum seeker is a person who makes a request for refuge, usually in a foreign country.

Asylum seeker(s) may also refer to:
 Asylum Seekers (film), a 2009 black comedy film
 Hellboy: Asylum Seeker, a 2003 video game based on the comic book series Hellboy
 The Asylum Seeker, a novel by Dutch author published in 2003

See also
 Seeking Asylum (film), a 1979 Italian comedy film